The Mérignac internment camp, also known as the Beau-Désert internment camp, was a French internment and transit camp for Roma, Jews, French members of the Resistance, and political prisoners; it was located in the district of Beau-Désert in the commune of Mérignac, near Bordeaux, in German occupied France during World War II.

History
After the Fall of France, the German authorities converted a confinement center, built at the site of a former WW1 laundry, in the district of Beau-Désert, near Merignac, into a prison. The Mérignac camp comprised one barrack and a barbed-wire fence, it was managed by director René Rousseau and guarded by the French gendarmerie.

In December 1940, the regional prefect François Pierre-Alype, acting in accordance with orders from the Bordeaux  (German Command), organised the internment of around 300 Roma (Gypsies, Tziganes or nomads in reports) including children. On 21 March 1941, the Roma were replaced in Merignac by political detainees from the Bordeaux region when a new group of 148 communists arrived. In April 1941 came the first Jews, victims of roundups, followed by prostitutes and in June French members of the Resistance. The jewish internees were temporarily held in Mérignac before getting transferred to the Drancy camp via the Bordeaux train station, while in Mérignac the Jews were segregated from the other prisoners.

In October 1941, 35 of the Merignac political prisoners, arrested in 1939 because of communist activities, were transferred to the Souge military camp  to be executed. Fifty hostages were shot in retaliation for the killing of German military adviser Hans Gottfried Reimers, by the French Resistance, in Bordeaux three days earlier. German SS-Sturmbannführer Herbert Hagenn was directly responsible for the execution of the hostages. In September 1942, an additional 70 Mérignac internees were executed in Souge.

The internment camp of Merignac held 560 detainees in November 1943 then 224 by April 1944; In November 1943, only 70 to 85 Jews were left in the camp, In December there were none. The deportations continued in the department until June 1944, as facilitated by Maurice Papon the prefect of Gironde appointed in June 1942.

On 26 August 1944, the French Forces of the Interior  liberated the remaining detainees of the Mérignac camp and replaced them with collaborators.

Transfers and deportations
Convoys taking Jewish internees to Drancy for transport to the German death camps:
 Convoy of 18 July 1942, (171 deportees)
 Convoy of 26 August 1942, (444 deportees including 57 children)
 Convoy of 19 October 1942, (173 deportees).

Between February and June 1943, an additional 107 Jews held in Mérignac were deported

Notable Mérignac incarcerees
 Louis de La Bardonnie, member of the French Resistance
 Robert Aron, French historian and writer

See also
 The Holocaust in France
 Holocaust train
 Internment camps in France

Notes

References

Sources

External links
 Le camp de Mérignac-Beaudésert (in French)

World War II internment camps in France
Nazi concentration camps in France
Deportation
Vichy France